Eken is a surname. Notable people with the surname include:

Bülent Eken (1923–2016), Turkish footballer and manager
Kent Eken (born 1963), American politician
Korkut Eken (born 1945), Turkish security officer
Reha Eken (1925–2013), Turkish footballer and manager
Tompa Eken (born 1950), Swedish musician
Willis Eken (1931–2010), American politician

See also
Eken Mine (1935–2002), Japanese voice actor